Thomas Verny (born 1726; died 16 July 1808 in Clermont-l'Hérault) was a French lawyer, who had a political career at the start of the Revolution.

Lawyer in the Parliament of Toulouse, Thomas Verny was elected député of the third estate of the bailiwick of Montpellier in the Estates-General of 1789
 
Thomas Verny was also a member of the Jeux floraux of Toulouse.

18th-century French lawyers
1726 births
1808 deaths
People from Toulouse